The 1994 Abierto Mexicano, also known by its sponsored name Abierto Mexicano Telcel, was a men's tennis tournament held in Mexico City, Mexico that was part of the ATP World Series of the 1994 ATP Tour. It was the second edition of the tournament and was held from 21 February through 28 February 1994. First-seeded Thomas Muster won the singles title, his second win in a row at Mexico City.

Finals

Singles
 Thomas Muster defeated  Roberto Jabali, 6–3, 6–1
 It was Muster 1st singles title of the year and the 21st of his career.

Doubles
 Francisco Montana /  Bryan Shelton defeated  Luke Jensen /  Murphy Jensen, 6–3, 6–4

References

External links
 ITF tournament edition details

Abierto Mexicano Telcel
Mexican Open (tennis)
1994 in Mexican tennis